Al-Twayti is a sub-district located in al-Saddah District, Ibb Governorate, Yemen. Al-Twayti had a population of 10873 according to the 2004 census.

References 

Sub-districts in As Saddah District